A princess lointaine or princesse lointaine, (in French, "distant princess") is a stock character of an unattainable loved figure. 
The name comes from the play La Princesse Lointaine by Edmond Rostand (1895), and draws on medieval romances.  The romantic interest of many knights errant, she was usually a woman of much higher birth, often far distant from the knight, and usually wealthier than he was, beautiful, and of admirable character.  Some knights had, indeed, fallen in love with the princess owing to hearing descriptions of her, without seeing her, as tales said Jaufré Rudel had fallen in love with Hodierna of Tripoli. Amour de loin ("Love from long away") is a term used in romances and their study.

The term has been used subsequently to refer to women whose chief characteristic as love interests has been their unattainability. It may also be used metaphorically for unattainable objects or targets of various sorts.

At times, the idealised lady of courtly love could be a princesse lointaine, a far-away princess, and some tales told of men who had fallen in love with women whom they had never seen, merely on hearing their perfection described, but normally she was not so distant. As the etiquette of courtly love became more complicated, the knight might wear the colors of his lady: where blue or black were sometimes the colors of faithfulness, green could be a sign of unfaithfulness. Salvation, previously found in the hands of the priesthood, now came from the hands of one's lady. In some cases, there were also women troubadours who expressed the same sentiment for men.

See also 

 Courtly love
 Domnei
 Girl next door
 Unrequited love

Female stock characters
Courtly love
Fictional princesses